Alec Robertson may refer to:
 Alec Robertson (bowls), lawn bowls competitor for New Zealand
 Alec Robertson (music critic) (1892–1982), British writer, broadcaster and music critic
 Alec Robertson (rugby union) (1877–1941), Scottish rugby union player

See also  
 Alexander Robertson (disambiguation)